2001 (Diario 2001) is a Venezuelan newspaper. It was established by Bloque De Armas in 1973, launching its first edition on 2 July 1973 under the directorship of Rafael Poleo. Initially launched as a competitor to the evening newspaper El Mundo of rival media group Cadena Capriles, its sales did not meet expectations (despite its distinguishing use of colour printing) and it converted to a morning newspaper.

See also 
 List of newspapers in Venezuela

References

External links
Official website

1973 establishments in Venezuela
Mass media in Caracas
Newspapers published in Venezuela
Publications established in 1973
Spanish-language newspapers